Kaththri Achige Dona Chandrika Lakmalee (born 27 October 1978) is a Sri Lankan former cricketer who played as a right-arm leg break bowler. She appeared in one Test match and 10 One Day Internationals for Sri Lanka between 1998 and 2000, including being part of the side's squad at the 2000 Women's Cricket World Cup. She played domestic cricket for Colts Cricket Club.

References

External links
 
 

1978 births
Living people
Cricketers from Colombo
Sri Lankan women cricketers
Sri Lanka women Test cricketers
Sri Lanka women One Day International cricketers
Colts Cricket Club women cricketers